A list of films produced in Argentina in 1941.

External links
 Argentine films of 1941 at the Internet Movie Database

1941
Films
Argentine